John Warren Marin (born October 12, 1944) is an American former professional basketball player.  A 201 cm (6-foot, 7-inch) guard/forward from Duke University, Marin was named to the 1967 NBA All-Rookie Team and spent 11 seasons in the National Basketball Association (1966–1977), playing for the Baltimore Bullets, Houston Rockets, Buffalo Braves and Chicago Bulls. The left-handed Marin was a two-time All-Star and scored 12,541 points in his career. He led the NBA in free throw percentage during the 1971–72 NBA season.

Marin played a key role in Baltimore’s trip to the 1971 NBA Finals, averaging postseason career highs of 20.6 points, 8.1 rebounds, and 3.1 assists per playoff game as the Bullets upset the defending champ New York Knicks in the Eastern Conference Finals, before ultimately losing to the Milwaukee Bucks in the finals. 

On November 7, 1971, Marin scored a career-high 42 points in a 109-106 loss to his later team, the Rockets.

He is perhaps most remembered for being traded to the Rockets (along with future considerations) for Elvin Hayes on June 23, 1972.

After retiring from the NBA, Marin entered Duke University Law School and graduated with his Juris Doctor in 1980. Presently (2006), he is a partner in the Richmond, Virginia-based law firm of Williams Mullen where he focuses his practice on sports law. He acts as outside counsel to the National Basketball Retired Players Association, and also represents basketball players performing abroad.

Marin served for three years (1998–2000) as the executive director of the Celebrity Players Tour, a professional golf circuit for notable ex-pro athletes and entertainers. During his tenure, the tour grew from five to 15 events that support various charities around the country. He has been a playing member and has served on its board of directors.Marin is currently involved with the United States Marine Corps and Hope For The Warriors, a non-profit based out of Jacksonville, N.C. He teaches golf and other sports activities to United States Marines who were severely wounded in combat.

Marin has been elected to the North Carolina, Pennsylvania and Duke Sports halls of fame. He currently serves on the Be Active North Carolina Campaign Cabinet.  Marin was valedictorian of his high school class at Farrell High School.

NBA career statistics

Regular season

Playoffs

Notes

External links

 College stats at Sports Reference
 Professional stats at Basketball Reference
 Klingaman, Mike. "Catching Up With...Jack Marin," The Toy Department (The Baltimore Sun sports blog), Tuesday, May 12, 2009.

1944 births
Living people
All-American college men's basketball players
Amateur Athletic Union men's basketball players
American men's basketball players
Baltimore Bullets (1963–1973) draft picks
Baltimore Bullets (1963–1973) players
Basketball players from Pennsylvania
Buffalo Braves players
Chicago Bulls players
Duke Blue Devils men's basketball players
Houston Rockets players
National Basketball Association All-Stars
People from Sharon, Pennsylvania
Shooting guards
Small forwards